Hilda Dresen (11 May 1896 – 5 February 1981) was an Estonian radio-telegraphist and esperantist, translator. She mainly translated Estonian poetry into Esperanto.

She studied Esperanto in 1913.

She did collaborations, e.g., for Literatura Mondo, La Nica Literatura Revuo, Norda Prismo (1955-1972).

In 1967, she also published her own poetry collection Norda Naturo ('Northern Nature').

References

External links
 Hilda Dresen at Estonian Writers' Online Dictionary

1896 births
1981 deaths
Estonian translators
Estonian Esperantists
Estonian women poets
20th-century Estonian poets
People from Kuusalu Parish